The year 2017 is the 7th year in the history of the Fight Nights Global, a mixed martial arts promotion based in Russia. It started broadcasting through a television agreement with  Match TV.

List of events

Fight Nights Global 58: Brandão vs. Machaev

Fight Nights Global 58: Brandão vs. Machaev was a mixed martial arts event held by Fight Nights Global on January 28, 2017, at the Ali Aliyev Sports Palace in Kaspiysk, Russia.

Background
This event featured a lightweight superfight between one of the most dominant lightweight in Europe, former Bellator heavyweight champion Murad Machaev and UFC veteran the Brazilian Diego Brandão as headliner.

For undisclosed reason Stanislav Molodtsov was forced to withdraw from his Grand-Prix match against Abusupyan Alikhanov, he was subsequently replaced by Pavel Doroftei.

Results

Fight Nights Global 59: Minakov vs. Linderman

Fight Nights Global 59: Minakov vs. Linderman was a mixed martial arts event held by Fight Nights Global on February 23, 2017, at the Ali Aliyev Sports Palace in Kaspiysk, Russia.

Background
This event featured a heavyweight superfight between one of the most dominant heavyweights in the game, unbeaten former Bellator heavyweight champion Vitaly Minakov and the American DJ Linderman as headliner.

Also featured on the card, was a number one contender fight for the Fight Nights Lightweight Championship between Akhmet Aliev and Efrain Escudero.

Results

Fight Nights Global 60: Aryshev vs. Khasanov

Fight Nights Global 60: Aryshev vs. Khasanov was a mixed martial arts event held by Fight Nights Global on March 4, 2017, at the Tax Committee Sports Center in Dushanbe, Tajikistan.

Results

Fight Nights Global 61: Aleksakhin vs. Enomoto

Fight Nights Global 61: Aleksakhin  vs. Enomoto was a mixed martial arts event held by Fight Nights Global on March 11, 2017, at the Bryansk Ice Palace in Bryansk, Russia.

Background
This event featured a middleweight superfight between Nikolay Aleksakhin and Yasubey Enomoto as headliner.

Ayub Gimbatov was injured during the preparation for his fight and was forced to withdraw from his match against Giorgi Lobzhanidze. Instead Lobzhanidze has  fight with  the double world champion and European MMA champion Gadzhimurad Khiramagomedov.

Results

Fight Nights Global 62: Matmuratov vs. Kurzanov

Fight Nights Global 62: Matmuratov vs. Kurzanov was a mixed martial arts event held by Fight Nights Global on March 31, 2017, at the Krylatskoye Sports Palace in Moscow, Russia.

Background
This event will feature two Grand-Prix final, first for the inaugural Fight Nights Global Heavyweight Championship between Sergey Pavlovich and Mikhail Mokhnatkin as headliner, second For the inaugural Fight Nights Global Featherweight Championship between Ilya Kurzanov and Movlid Khaibulaev as co-headliner.

Kirill Sidelnikov was injured and couldn't participate in the Final of the Grand Prix, and was subsequently replaced by Mikhail Mokhnatkin.

Results

Fight Nights Global Featherweight Grand-Prix bracket

1Roman Silagadze was injured and couldn't participate in the Semi-Finals of the Grand Prix, and was subsequently replaced by Paata Robakidze.

Fight Nights Global 63: Alibekov vs. Khamitov

Fight Nights Global 63: Alibekov vs. Khamitov was a mixed martial arts event held by Fight Nights Global on April 21, 2017, at the Fetisov Arena in Vladivostok, Russia.

Results

Fight Nights Global 64: Nam vs. Bagautinov

Fight Nights Global 64: Nam vs. Bagautinov was a mixed martial arts event held by Fight Nights Global on April 27, 2017, at the VTB Arena in Moscow, Russia.

Results

Fight Nights Global 65: Asatryan vs. Zhumagulov

Fight Nights Global 65: Asatryan vs. Zhumagulov was a mixed martial arts event held by Fight Nights Global on May 19, 2017, at the Barys Arena in Astana, Kazakhstan.

Results

Fight Nights Global 66: Alikhanov vs. Murtazaliev

Fight Nights Global 66: Alikhanov vs. Murtazaliev was a mixed martial arts event held by Fight Nights Global on May 21, 2017, at the Ali Aliyev Sports Palace in Kaspiysk, Russia.

Results

Fight Nights Global 67: Brandão vs. Galiev

Fight Nights Global 67: Brandão vs. Galiev was a mixed martial arts event held by Fight Nights Global on May 25, 2017, at the DIVS Arena in Ekaterinburg, Russia.

Results

Fight Nights Global 68: Pavlovich vs. Mokhnatkin

Fight Nights Global 68: Pavlovich vs. Mokhnatkin was a mixed martial arts event held by Fight Nights Global on June 2, 2017, at the Yubileyny Sports Palace in Saint Petersburg, Russia.

Results

Fight Nights Global Heavyweight Grand-Prix bracket

1Kirill Sidelnikov was injured and couldn't participate in the Final of the Grand Prix, and was subsequently replaced by Mikhail Mokhnatkin.

Fight Nights Global 69: Bagautinov vs. Nobre

Fight Nights Global 69: Bagautinov vs. Nobre was a mixed martial arts event held by Fight Nights Global on June 30, 2017, at the Ice Sports Palace Sibir, in Novosibirsk, Russia.

Results

Fight Nights Global 70: Palhares vs. Ivanov

Fight Nights Global 70: Palhares vs. Ivanov was a mixed martial arts event held by Fight Nights Global on July 7, 2017, at the FSK Sports Complex in Ulan-Ude, Russia.

Results

Fight Nights Global 71: Mineev vs. Michailidis

Fight Nights Global 71: Mineev vs. Michailidis was a mixed martial arts event held by Fight Nights Global on July 29, 2017, at the Luzhniki Palace of Sports in Moscow, Russia.

Results

Fight Nights Global 72: Hill vs. Engibaryan

Fight Nights Global 72: Hill vs. Engibaryan was a mixed martial arts event held by Fight Nights Global on August 24, 2017, at the Ice Cube in Sochi, Russia.

Results

Fight Nights Global 73: Aliev vs. Brandão

Fight Nights Global 73: Aliev vs. Brandão was a mixed martial arts event held by Fight Nights Global on September 4, 2017, at the Ali Aliev Sports Palace in Kaspiysk, Russia.

Results

Fight Nights Global 74: Aleksakhin vs. Graves

Fight Nights Global 74: Aleksakhin vs. Graves was a mixed martial arts event held by Fight Nights Global on September 29, 2017, at the Luzhniki Palace of Sports in Moscow, Russia.

Results

Fight Nights Global 75: Deák vs. Chistyakov

Fight Nights Global 75: Deák vs. Chistyakov was a mixed martial arts event held by Fight Nights Global on October 6, 2017, at the Yubileyny Sports Palace in Saint Petersburg, Russia.

Results

Fight Nights Global 76: Bagautinov vs. Martinez

Fight Nights Global 76: Bagautinov vs. Martinez was a mixed martial arts event held by Fight Nights Global on October 8, 2017, at the Olympus Arena in Krasnodar, Russia.

Results

Fight Nights Global 77: Krylov vs. Newton

Fight Nights Global 77: Krylov vs. Newton was a mixed martial arts event held by Fight Nights Global on October 13, 2017, at the SOK Energetik in Surgut, Russia.

Results

Fight Nights Global 78: Tsarev vs. Guseinov

Fight Nights Global 78: Tsarev vs. Guseinov was a mixed martial arts event held by Fight Nights Global on November 4, 2017, at the Lada Arena in Tolyatti, Russia.

Results

Fight Nights Global 79: Pavlovich vs. Sidelnikov

Fight Nights Global 79: Pavlovich vs. Sidelnikov was a mixed martial arts event held by Fight Nights Global on November 19, 2017, at the Diesel Arena in Penza, Russia.

Results

Fight Nights Global 80: Khamitov vs. Queally

Fight Nights Global 80: Khamitov vs. Queally was a mixed martial arts event held by Fight Nights Global on November 26, 2017, at the Almaty Arena in Almaty, Kazakhstan.

Results

Fight Nights Global 81: Matmuratov vs. Ignatiev

Fight Nights Global 81: Matmuratov vs. Ignatiev was a mixed martial arts event held by Fight Nights Global on December 15, 2017, at the Arena Omsk in Omsk, Russia.

Results

Fight Nights Global 82: Minakov vs. Johnson

Fight Nights Global 82: Minakov vs. Johnson will be a mixed martial arts event held by Fight Nights Global on December 16, 2017, at the Luzhniki Palace of Sports in Moscow, Russia.

Results

References

Fight Nights Global events
2017 in mixed martial arts
AMC Fight Nights